Malaia garnet or Malaya garnet is a gemological varietal name for light to dark slightly pinkish orange, reddish orange, or yellowish orange garnet, that are of a mixture within the pyralspite series pyrope, almandine, and spessartine with a little calcium.  The name Malaia is translated from Swahili to mean, prostitute.  It is found in east Africa, in the Umba Valley bordering Tanzania and Kenya.

References

Garnet gemstones